In mathematics, a Brauer algebra is an associative algebra introduced by Richard Brauer in the context of the representation theory of the orthogonal group. It plays the same role that the symmetric group does for the representation theory of the general linear group in Schur–Weyl duality.

Structure 

The Brauer algebra  is a -algebra depending on the choice of a positive integer . Here  is an indeterminate, but in practice  is often specialised to the dimension of the fundamental representation of an orthogonal group . The Brauer algebra has the dimension

Diagrammatic definition 

A basis of  consists of all pairings on a set of  elements  (that is, all perfect matchings of a complete graph : any two of the  elements may be matched to each other, regardless of their symbols). The elements  are usually written in a row, with the elements  beneath them.  

Thereby all closed loops in the middle of AB are removed. The product  of the basis elements is then defined to be the basis element corresponding to the new pairing multiplied by  where  is the number of deleted loops. In the example .

Generators and relations 

 can also be defined as the -algebra with generators  satisfying the following relations:

 Relations of the symmetric group:

 whenever 

 Almost-idempotent relation:

 Commutation:

whenever
 Tangle relations

 Untwisting:
:

Basic properties 

The Brauer algebra is a subalgebra of the partition algebra.

The Brauer algebra  is semisimple if .

The subalgebra of  generated by the generators  is the group algebra of the symmetric group . 

The subalgebra of  generated by the generators  is the Temperley-Lieb algebra . 

The Brauer algebra is a cellular algebra.

Representations

Brauer-Specht modules 

Brauer-Specht modules are finite-dimensional modules of the Brauer algebra. 
If  is such that  is semisimple,
These modules are parametrized by partitions, because they are built from the Specht modules of the symmetric group, which are themselves parametrized by partitions.

For any ring , the space  is a left -module, where basis elements of  act by graph concatenation. (This action can produce matchings that violate the restriction that  cannot match with one another: such graphs must be modded out.) Moreover, the space  is a right -module. 

The dimension is 

i.e. the product of a binomial coefficient, a double factorial, and the dimension of the corresponding Specht module, which is given by the hook length formula.

Schur-Weyl duality 

Let  be a euclidean vector space of dimension , and  the corresponding orthogonal group. The tensor power  is naturally a -module:  acts by switching the th and th tensor factor and  acts by contraction followed by expansion in the th and th tensor factor, i.e.  acts as

(The sum is in fact independent of the choice of this basis.)

The tensor power  is therefore both an - and a -module and satisfies

.

If  is a negative even integer, the Brauer algebra is related by Schur-Weyl duality to the symplectic group , rather than the orthogonal group.

Walled Brauer algebra

These generators obey the basic relations of  that involve them, plus the two relations

(In , these two relations follow from the basic relations.)

For  a natural integer, let  be the natural representation of the general linear group . 

See also
Birman–Wenzl algebra, a deformation of the Brauer algebra.

References

Representation theory
Diagram algebras